The 1960 St. John's Redmen baseball team represented the St. John's University in the 1960 NCAA University Division baseball season. The Redmen played their home games at Alley Pond Park. The team was coached by Jack Kaiser in his St. John's University in his 5th year at St. John's.

The Redmen, didn't qualify for the District II Tournament, because they finished second in the Metropolitan New York Conference, but with the Hofstra Pride opting out of the tournament due to their finals schedule, the Redmen were invited in their place. They won District II to advance to the College World Series, where they were defeated by the Arizona Wildcats.

Roster

Schedule 

! style="" | Regular Season
|- valign="top" 

|- align="center" bgcolor="#ccffcc"
| 1 || April 6 || at  || Unknown • New York, New York || 17–4 || 1–0 || 1–0
|- align="center" bgcolor="#ccffcc"
| 2 || April 8 || at  || Unknown • Brookville, New York || 8–2 || 2–0 || 1–0
|- align="center" bgcolor="#ffcccc"
| 3 || April  ||  || Alley Pond Park • New York, New York || 1–3 || 2–1 || 1–1
|- align="center" bgcolor="#ccffcc"
| 4 || April 12 || at  || Unknown • New York, New York || 4–3 || 3–1 || 2–1
|- align="center" bgcolor="#ffcccc"
| 5 || April 16 || at  || Unknown • New York, New York || 0–2 || 3–2 || 2–2
|- align="center" bgcolor="#ffcccc"
| 6 || April 20 || at  || Van Cortlandt Park • New York, New York || 0–6 || 3–3 || 2–3
|- align="center" bgcolor="#ccffcc"
| 7 || April 21 || at  || Unknown • Garden City, New York || 12–3 || 4–3 || 2–3
|- align="center" bgcolor="#ffcccc"
| 8 || April 22 || at  || Doubleday Field • West Point, New York || 4–9 || 4–4 || 2–3
|- align="center" bgcolor="#ccffcc"
| 9 || April 23 ||  || Alley Pond Park • New York, New York || 6–3 || 5–4 || 3–3
|- align="center" bgcolor="#ffcccc"
| 10 || April 26 || at  || University Field • Hempstead, New York || 2–10 || 5–5 || 3–4
|- align="center" bgcolor="#ccffcc"
| 11 || April 28 ||  || Alley Pond Park • New York, New York || 7–4 || 6–5 || 3–4
|- align="center" bgcolor="#ccffcc"
| 12 || April 30 || Brooklyn || Alley Pond Park • New York, New York || 3–1 || 7–5 || 4–4
|-

|- align="center" bgcolor="#ccffcc"
| 13 || May 2 ||  || Alley Pond Park • New York, New York || 3–1 || 8–5 || 4–4
|- align="center" bgcolor="#ccffcc"
| 14 || May 5 || at  || Unknown • East Orange, New Jersey || 12–9 || 9–5 || 4–4
|- align="center" bgcolor="#ccffcc"
| 15 || May 5 || at NYU || Unknown • New York, New York || 13–6 || 10–5 || 5–4
|- align="center" bgcolor="#ccffcc"
| 16 || May 7 || Fordham || Alley Pond Park • New York, New York || 6–5 || 11–5 || 6–4
|- align="center" bgcolor="#ccffcc"
| 17 || May 10 || Wagner || Alley Pond Park • New York, New York || 14–8 || 12–5 || 7–4
|- align="center" bgcolor="#ccffcc"
| 18 || May 12 || vs Hofstra || Barasch Field • New York, New York || 2–1 || 13–5 || 8–4
|- align="center" bgcolor="#ccffcc"
| 19 || May 14 || at Manhattan || Van Cortlandt Park • New York, New York || 3–2 || 14–5 || 9–4
|- align="center" bgcolor="#ccffcc"
| 20 || May 17 || at  || Unknown • New York, New York || 13–2 || 15–5 || 10–4
|- align="center" bgcolor="#ccffcc"
| 21 || May 20 || at  || Unknown • Teaneck, New Jersey || 15–3 || 16–5 || 10–4
|- align="center" bgcolor="#ccffcc"
| 22 || May 21 || at  || Owen T. Carroll Field • South Orange, New Jersey || 6–2 || 17–5 || 10–4
|-

|-
! style="" | Postseason
|- valign="top"

|- align="center" bgcolor="#ccffcc"
| 23 || May 27 || vs  || Doubleday Field • Cooperstown, New York || 4–3 || 18–5 || 9–3
|- align="center" bgcolor="#ccffcc"
| 24 || May 28 ||  || Doubleday Field • Cooperstown, New York || 7–2 || 19–5 || 9–3
|-

|- align="center" bgcolor="#ffcccc"
| 25 || June 14 || vs Southern California || Omaha Municipal Stadium • Omaha, Nebraska || 1–3 || 19–6 || 9–3
|- align="center" bgcolor="#ccffcc"
| 26 || June 15 || vs Colorado State College || Omaha Municipal • Omaha, Nebraska || 3–2 || 20–6 || 9–3
|- align="center" bgcolor="#ffcccc"
| 27 || June 17 || vs Arizona || Omaha Municipal • Omaha, Nebraska || 4–11 || 20–7 || 9–3
|-

References 

St. John's Red Storm baseball seasons
St. John's Redmen baseball
College World Series seasons